The 1991–92 FIS Cross-Country World Cup was the 11th official World Cup season in cross-country skiing for men and women. The World Cup started in Silver Star, Canada, from 8 December 1991 and finished in Vang, Norway, on 14 March 1992. Bjørn Dæhlie of Norway won the overall men's cup and Yelena Välbe of the CIS won the women's.

Calendar

Men

Women

Note: Until the 1994 Winter Olympics, Olympic races were part of the World Cup. Hence results from those races are included in the World Cup overall.

Men's team

Women's team

Overall standings

Men

Women

Achievements
Victories in this World Cup (all-time number of victories as of 1991–92 season in parentheses)

Men
 , 6 (11) first places
 , 5 (8) first places
 , 1 (10) first place

Women
 , 4 (19) first places
 , 4 (6) first place
 , 2 (3) first places
 , 1 (11) first place
 , 1 (1) first place

References

FIS Cross-Country World Cup seasons
World Cup 1991-92
World Cup 1991-92